Dipsosaurus catalinensis, the Catalina desert iguana, is a species of lizard in the family Iguanidae. The species is native to Isla Santa Catalina in Mexico.

References

Dipsosaurus
Endemic reptiles of Mexico
Fauna of Gulf of California islands
Reptiles described in 1922
Taxa named by John Van Denburgh
Endemic fauna of the Baja California Peninsula